Herbert Smith was an American baseball pitcher and right fielder in the Negro leagues. He played with the Kansas City Monarchs, St. Louis Giants, Chicago Giants, and Washington Potomacs from 1920 to 1924.

External links
 and Seamheads

Kansas City Monarchs players
Washington Potomacs players
Chicago Giants players
St. Louis Giants players
Year of birth missing
Year of death missing
Baseball pitchers
Baseball outfielders